The Tour de Girolata or Fortin de Girolata is a Genoese tower located in the commune of Osani (Corse-du-Sud) on the west coast of the French island of Corsica.

The tower was built between 1551 and 1552. The construction was initially supervised by Gieronimo da Levanto but on his death he was replaced by Giovan Battista de'Franchi. The tower was one of a series of coastal defences constructed by the Republic of Genoa between 1530 and 1620 to stem the attacks by Barbary pirates.  In 2008 it was listed as one of the official historical monuments of France.

The tower is not open to the public. Since 2009 it has been owned by a French government agency, the Conservatoire du littoral. The agency plans to purchase  of the land around the Golfe de Girolata and by 2011 had acquired .

See also
List of Genoese towers in Corsica

References

External links
 Includes information on how to reach 90 towers and many photographs.

Towers in Corsica
Monuments historiques of Corsica